Mahamadou Doucouré (born 22 May 2000) is a professional footballer who plays as a forward for Ligue 2 club Nîmes. Born in France, he plays for the Mali national team.

International career
Born in France, Doucouré is of Malian descent. He made his debut for the Mali national team in a 1–0 FIFA World Cup qualification win over Rwanda on 1 September 2021.

References

External links 
 Nîmes Olympique profile
 

2000 births
Living people
Sportspeople from Montreuil, Seine-Saint-Denis
Malian footballers
Mali international footballers
French footballers
French people of Malian descent
Association football forwards
RC Strasbourg Alsace players
Nîmes Olympique players
Championnat National 3 players
Ligue 1 players
Ligue 2 players
Footballers from Seine-Saint-Denis